Stopa is a Polish language surname, with the English meaning of "foot".

List of people with the surname 
 Jacek Stopa (born 1987), Polish chess player
Karol Stopa (born 1948), Polish sports journalist
 (born 1971), Polish footballer
Wanda Stopa (1900–1924), Polish-American attorney and murderer.

Surnames
Polish-language surnames
Surnames of Polish origin